Seen Between the Lines is a live Testament home video that was released June 25, 1991 on VHS and re-released to DVD on March 8, 2005.

Track listing
 "Eerie Inhabitants"
 "Face in the Sky"
 "Greenhouse Effect"
 "Souls of Black"
 "Sins of Omission"
 "Disciples of the Watch"
 "Nobody's Fault" (music video)
 "Practice What You Preach" (music video)
 "Souls of Black" (music video)
 "The Legacy" (music video)

Credits
Chuck Billy: vocals
Alex Skolnick: lead guitar
Eric Peterson: Rhythm/lead guitar
Greg Christian: bass
Louie Clemente: drums

1991 video albums
Live video albums
1991 live albums
Testament (band) live albums
Testament (band) video albums